Cnemaspis bidongensis, also known as the Pulau Bidong rock gecko, is a species of gecko endemic to Malaysia.

References

Cnemaspis
Reptiles described in 2014